Fermi National Accelerator Laboratory (Fermilab), located just outside Batavia, Illinois, near Chicago, is a United States Department of Energy national laboratory specializing in high-energy particle physics. Since 2007, Fermilab has been operated by the Fermi Research Alliance, a joint venture of the University of Chicago, and the Universities Research Association (URA). Fermilab is a part of the Illinois Technology and Research Corridor.

Fermilab's Main Injector, two miles (3.3 km) in circumference, is the laboratory's most powerful particle accelerator. The accelerator complex that feeds the Main Injector is under upgrade, and construction of the first building for the new PIP-II linear accelerator began in 2020.   Until 2011, Fermilab was the home of the 6.28 km (3.90 mi) circumference Tevatron accelerator.  The ring-shaped tunnels of the Tevatron and the Main Injector are visible from the air and by satellite.

Fermilab aims to become a world center in neutrino physics.   It is the host of the multi-billion dollar Deep Underground Neutrino Experiment (DUNE) now under construction.   The project has suffered delays and, in 2022, the journals Science and Scientific American each published articles describing the project as "troubled".   
 
Ongoing neutrino experiments are  ICARUS (Imaging Cosmic and Rare Underground Signals) and NOνA (NuMI Off-Axis νe Appearance). Completed neutrino experiments include MINOS (Main Injector Neutrino Oscillation Search), MINOS+, MiniBooNE and SciBooNE (SciBar Booster Neutrino Experiment) and MicroBooNE (Micro Booster Neutrino Experiment).

On-site experiments outside of the neutrino program include the SeaQuest fixed-target experiment and Muon g-2. Fermilab continues to participate in the work at the Large Hadron Collider (LHC); it serves as a Tier 1 site in the Worldwide LHC Computing Grid.  Fermilab also pursues research in quantum information science. It founded the Fermilab Quantum Institute in 2019. Since 2020, it also is home to the SQMS (Superconducting Quantum and Materials Science) center.

In the public realm, Fermilab is home to a native prairie ecosystem restoration project and hosts many cultural events: public science lectures and symposia, classical and contemporary music concerts, folk dancing and arts galleries.  The site is open from dawn to dusk to visitors who present valid photo identification.

Asteroid 11998 Fermilab is named in honor of the laboratory.

History

Weston, Illinois, was a community next to Batavia voted out of existence by its village board in 1966 to provide a site for Fermilab.

The laboratory was founded in 1969 as the National Accelerator Laboratory; it was renamed in honor of Enrico Fermi in 1974. The laboratory's first director was Robert Rathbun Wilson, under whom the laboratory opened ahead of time and under budget. Many of the sculptures on the site are of his creation. He is the namesake of the site's high-rise laboratory building, whose unique shape has become the symbol for Fermilab and which is the center of activity on the campus.

After Wilson stepped down in 1978 to protest the lack of funding for the lab, Leon M. Lederman took on the job. It was under his guidance that the original accelerator was replaced with the Tevatron, an accelerator capable of colliding protons and antiprotons at a combined energy of 1.96 TeV. Lederman stepped down in 1989 and remained Director Emeritus until his death. The science education center at the site was named in his honor.

The later directors are:
 John Peoples, 1989 to 1996
 Michael S. Witherell, July 1999 to June 2005
 Piermaria Oddone, July 2005 to July 2013 
 Nigel Lockyer, September 2013 to April 2022
 Lia Merminga, April 2022 to present

Accelerators

The Tevatron
Prior to the startup in 2008 of the Large Hadron Collider (LHC) near Geneva, Switzerland, the Tevatron was the most powerful particle accelerator in the world, accelerating protons and antiprotons to energies of 980 GeV, and producing proton-antiproton collisions with energies of up to 1.96 TeV, the first accelerator to reach one "tera-electron-volt" energy.  At , it was the world's fourth-largest particle accelerator in circumference.  One of its most important achievements was the 1995 discovery of the top quark, announced by research teams using the Tevatron's CDF and DØ detectors. It was shut down in 2011.

Fermilab Accelerator Complex
Since 2013, the first stage in the acceleration process (pre-accelerator injector) in the Fermilab chain of accelerators takes place in two ion sources which ionize hydrogen gas. The gas is introduced into a container lined with molybdenum electrodes, each a matchbox-sized, oval-shaped cathode and a surrounding anode, separated by 1 mm and held in place by glass ceramic insulators. A magnetron generates a plasma to form the ions near the metal surface. The ions are accelerated by the source to 35 keV and matched by low energy beam transport (LEBT) into the radio-frequency quadrupole (RFQ) which applies a 750 keV electrostatic field giving the ions their second acceleration. At the exit of RFQ, the beam is matched by medium energy beam transport (MEBT) into the entrance of the linear accelerator (linac).

The next stage of acceleration is linear particle accelerator (linac). This stage consists of two segments. The first segment has five drift tube cavities, operating at 201 MHz. The second stage has seven side-coupled cavities, operating at 805 MHz. At the end of linac, the particles are accelerated to 400 MeV, or about 70% of the speed of light. Immediately before entering the next accelerator, the H− ions pass through a carbon foil, becoming H+ ions (protons).

The resulting protons then enter the booster ring, a  circumference circular accelerator whose magnets bend beams of protons around a circular path. The protons travel around the Booster about 20,000 times in 33 milliseconds, adding energy with each revolution until they leave the Booster accelerated to 8 GeV. In 2021, the lab announced that its latest superconducting YBCO magnet could increase field strength at a rate of 290 tesla per second, reaching a peak magnetic field strength of around 0.5 tesla.

The final acceleration is applied by the Main Injector [circumference ], which is the smaller of the two rings in the last picture below (foreground). Completed in 1999, it has become Fermilab's "particle switchyard" in that it can route protons to any of the experiments installed along the beam lines after accelerating them to 120 GeV. Until 2011, the Main Injector provided protons to the antiproton ring [circumference ] and the Tevatron for further acceleration but now provides the last push before the particles reach the beam line experiments.

Proton improvement plan
Recognizing higher demands of proton beams to support new experiments, Fermilab began to improve their accelerators in 2011. Expected to continue for many years, the project has two phases: Proton Improvement Plan (PIP) and Proton Improvement Plan-II (PIP-II).

PIP (2011–2018)
The overall goals of PIP are to increase the repetition rate of the Booster beam from 7 Hz to 15 Hz and replace old hardware to increase reliability of the operation. Before the start of the PIP project, a replacement of the pre-accelerator injector was underway. The replacement of almost 40 year-old Cockcroft–Walton generators to RFQ started in 2009 and completed in 2012. At the Linac stage, the analog beam position monitor (BPM) modules were replaced with digital boards in 2013. A replacement of Linac vacuum pumps and related hardware is expected to be completed in 2015. A study on the replacement of 201 MHz drift tubes is still ongoing. At the boosting stage, a major component of the PIP is to upgrade the Booster ring to 15 Hz operation. The Booster has 19 radio frequency stations. Originally, the Booster stations were operating without solid-state drive system which was acceptable for 7 Hz but not 15 Hz operation. A demonstration project in 2004 converted one of the stations to solid state drive before the PIP project. As part of the project, the remaining stations were converted to solid state in 2013. Another major part of the PIP project is to refurbish and replace 40 year-old Booster cavities. Many cavities have been refurbished and tested to operate at 15 Hz. The completion of cavity refurbishment is expected in 2015, after which the repetition rate can be gradually increased to 15 Hz operation. A longer term upgrade is to replace the Booster cavities with a new design. The research and development of the new cavities is underway, with replacement expected in 2018.

PIP-II

The goals of PIP-II include a plan to delivery 1.2 MW of proton beam power from the Main Injector to the Deep Underground Neutrino Experiment target at 120 GeV and the power near 1 MW at 60 GeV with a possibility to extend the power to 2 MW in the future. The plan should also support the current 8 GeV experiments including Mu2e, Muon g−2, and other short-baseline neutrino experiments. These require an upgrade to the Linac to inject to the Booster with 800 MeV. The first option considered was to add 400 MeV "afterburner" superconducting Linac at the tail end of the existing 400 MeV. This would have required moving the existing Linac up . However, there were many technical issues with this approach. Instead, Fermilab is building a new 800 MeV superconducting Linac to inject to the Booster ring.

Construction of the first building for the PIP-II accelerator began in 2020. The new Linac site will be located on top of a small portion of Tevatron near the Booster ring in order to take advantage of existing electrical and water, and cryogenic infrastructure. The PIP-II Linac will have low energy beam transport line (LEBT), radio frequency quadrupole (RFQ), and medium energy beam transport line (MEBT) operated at the room temperature at with a 162.5 MHz and energy increasing from 0.03 MeV. The first segment of Linac will be operated at 162.5 MHz and energy increased up to 11 MeV. The second segment of Linac will be operated at 325 MHz and energy increased up to 177 MeV. The last segment of linac will be operated at 650 MHz and will have the final energy level of 800 MeV.

As of 2022, the estimated PIP-II accelerator start date for the accelerator is 2028. The project was approved for construction in April 2022 with an expected cost to the Department of Energy of $978M and with an additional $330M in contributions from international partners.

Experiments

List of past and ongoing experiments
 ANNIE
 ArgoNeuT: The Argon Neutrino Teststand detector
 Cryogenic Dark Matter Search (CDMS)
 COUPP: Chicagoland Observatory for Underground Particle Physics
 Dark Energy Survey (DES)
 Deep Underground Neutrino Experiment (DUNE), formerly known as Long Baseline Neutrino Experiment (LBNE)
 Holometer interferometer
 ICARUS experiment Originally located at the Laboratori Nazionali del Gran Sasso (LNGS), it will hold 760 tonnes of liquid Argon.
 MAGIS-100: The 100-meter-long Matter-wave Atomic Gradiometer Interferometric Sensor
 MiniBooNE: Mini Booster Neutrino Experiment
 MicroBooNE: Micro Booster Neutrino Experiment
 MINOS: Main Injector Neutrino Oscillation Search
 MINERνA: Main INjector ExpeRiment with νs on As
 MIPP: Main Injector Particle Production
 Mu2e: Muon-to-Electron Conversion Experiment
 Muon g−2: Measurement of the anomalous magnetic dipole moment of the muon
 NOνA: NuMI Off-axis νe Appearance
 SELEX: SEgmented Large-X baryon spectrometer EXperiment, run to study charmed baryons
 Sciboone: SciBar Booster Neutrino Experiment
 SeaQuest
 Short Baseline Neutrino Detector

Experiment highlights
Fermilab dismantled the CDF (Collider Detector at Fermilab) experiment to make the space available for IARC (Illinois Accelerator Research Center). Construction work has started for LBNF/DUNE and PIP-II while the NOνA and Muon g−2 experiments continue to collect data. The laboratory also conducts research in quantum information science, including the development of teleportation technology for the quantum internet and increasing the lifetime of superconducting resonators for use in quantum computers.

LBNF/DUNE

Fermilab strives to become the world leader in Neutrino physics through the Deep Underground Neutrino Experiment at the Long Baseline Neutrino Facility. Other leaders are CERN, which leads in Accelerator physics with the Large Hadron Collider (LHC), and Japan, which has been approved to build and lead the International Linear Collider (ILC). Fermilab will be the site of LBNF's future beamline, and the Sanford Underground Research Facility (SURF), in Lead, SD, is the site selected to house the massive far detector. The term "baseline" refers to the distance between the neutrino source and the detector. The far detector current design is for four modules of instrumented liquid argon with a fiducial volume of 10 kilotons each.

According to the 2016 Conceptual Design Report, the first two modules were expected to be complete in 2024, with the beam operational in 2026. The final modules were planned to be operational in 2027. In 2022, the cost for two far detector modules and the beam, alone, had risen to $3B. This led to a decision by the Department of Energy Office of Science to phase the experiment. Phase I would consist of two modules, to be completed in 2028-29, and the beamline, to be completed in 2032. The installation of phase II, the remaining two far detector modules, is not yet planned and will be at a cost above the $3B estimate for phase I.

A large prototype detector constructed at CERN took data with a test beam from 2018-2020. The results show that ProtoDUNE performed with greater than 99% efficiency.

LBNF/DUNE program in neutrino physics plans to measure fundamental physical parameters with high precision and to explore physics beyond the Standard Model. The measurements DUNE will make are expected to greatly increase the physics community's understanding of neutrinos and their role in the universe, thereby better elucidating the nature of matter and anti-matter. It will send the world's highest-intensity neutrino beam to a near detector on the Fermilab site and the far detector 800 miles (1300 km) away at SURF.

Other neutrino experiments
The MiniBooNE detector was a  diameter sphere containing 800 tons of mineral oil lined with 1,520 phototube detectors. An estimated 1 million neutrino events were recorded each year.  SciBooNE sat in the same neutrino beam as MiniBooNE but had fine-grained tracking capabilities. The NOνA experiment uses, and the MINOS experiment used, Fermilab's NuMI (Neutrinos at the Main Injector) beam, which is an intense beam of neutrinos that travels  through the Earth to the Soudan Mine in Minnesota and the Ash River, Minnesota, site of the NOνA far detector. In 2017, the ICARUS neutrino experiment was moved from CERN to Fermilab.

Muon g−2

Muon g−2: (pronounced “gee minus two”) is a particle physics experiment to measure the anomaly of the magnetic moment of a muon to a precision of 0.14 ppm, which will be a sensitive test of the Standard Model.

Fermilab is continuing an experiment conducted at Brookhaven National Laboratory to measure the anomalous magnetic dipole moment of the muon.

The magnetic dipole moment (g) of a charged lepton (electron, muon, or tau) is very nearly 2. The difference from 2 (the "anomalous" part) depends on the lepton, and can be computed quite exactly based on the current Standard Model of particle physics. Measurements of the electron are in excellent agreement with this computation. The Brookhaven experiment did this measurement for muons, a much more technically difficult measurement due to their short lifetime, and detected a tantalizing, but not definitive, 3 σ discrepancy between the measured value and the computed one.

The Brookhaven experiment ended in 2001, but 10 years later Fermilab acquired the equipment, and is working to make a more accurate measurement (smaller σ) which will either eliminate the discrepancy or, hopefully, confirm it as an experimentally observable example of physics beyond the Standard Model.

Central to the experiment is a 50 foot-diameter superconducting magnet with an exceptionally uniform magnetic field. This was transported, in one piece, from Brookhaven in Long Island, New York, to Fermilab in the summer of 2013.  The move traversed 3,200 miles over 35 days, mostly on a barge down the East Coast and up the Mississippi.

The magnet was refurbished and powered on in September 2015, and has been confirmed to have the same  p-p basic magnetic field uniformity that it had before the move.

The project worked on shimming the magnet to improve its magnetic field uniformity. This had been done at Brookhaven, but was disturbed by the move and had to be re-done at Fermilab.

In 2018, the experiment started taking data at Fermilab. In 2021, the laboratory reported that results from initial study involving the particle challenged the Standard Model, with the potential for discovery of new forces and particles.

CMS and the LHC Physics Center 
The LHC Physics Center (LPC) at Fermilab is a regional center of the Compact Muon Solenoid Collaboration (the experiment is housed at CERN). The LPC offers a vibrant community of CMS scientists from the US and plays a major role in the CMS detector commissioning, and in the design and development of the detector upgrade. Fermilab is the host laboratory for USCMS, which includes researchers from 50 U.S. universities including 715 students. Fermilab hosts the largest CMS Tier 1 computing center, handling approximately 40% of global CMS Tier 1 computing requests. On February 9, 2022, Fermilab's Patricia McBride (physicist) was elected spokesperson of the CMS collaboration.

Delays and Cost Overruns on Projects
In 2014, the Particle Physics Project Prioritization Panel ("P5") recommended three major initiatives for construction on the Fermilab site.  Two were particle physics experiments: the Deep Underground Neutrino Experiment and Mu2e. The third was the PIPII accelerator upgrade described above.    Also, P5 recommended Fermilab participation in LHC at CERN.

As of 2022, two P5-recommended Fermilab projects had suffered substantial delays:
 The Deep Underground Neutrino Experiment with the enabling Long Baseline Neutrino Facility was proposed to P5 as a $1B project; the cost estimate in 2021 dollars was $3B, with far detector operations beginning 2029 and full operation by 2032.
 The Mu2e experiment was to produce preliminary results in 2020, but this is now delayed until 2026.

Even smaller experiments, below the cost-level of individual P5 approval, that were proposed at the time of the 2014 P5 suffered considerable delay.  The Short-Baseline Neutrino Detector (SBND) that was proposed in 2014  with a $10M cost scale was originally scheduled for data taking in spring 2018, but is now scheduled to begin in autumn 2023.

The Department of Energy raised flags as early as Fiscal Year (FY) 2019.
Each year, the US Department of Energy Office of Science reviews and grades the national laboratories in its portfolio on eight performance metrics.  Fermilab has received the lowest grades among the national laboratories in FY2019, 2020, 2021 and 2022.  A rare C grade was assigned for project management in 2021, reflective of the delays and cost overruns.

Also, in 2020, the high-energy physics community expressed concern that the cost of major projects at Fermilab have led to diversion of funds from the high-energy physics core research program, harming the health of the field. Congress increased the annual HEP budget from less than $800 million by about $250M to more than $1 billion—a 30% increase that went mainly to support large projects at Fermilab.

The Fermilab project delays led to substantial change in leadership in 2022. In September, 2021, Nigel Lockyer, Director of Fermilab, resigned. Lockyer replaced by Lia Merminga, head of the PIP II project.  On March 31, 2022, James Siegrist, Associate Director for High Energy Physics in the Department of Energy Office of Science, who had overseen the response to the P5 report, stepped down.  Regina (Gina) Rameika joined the DOE’s Office of Science as the Associate Director for the Office of High Energy Physics in his place on November 7, 2022, moving from her role as spokesperson of the DUNE Experiment.

History of discoveries at Fermilab

The following particles were first directly observed at Fermilab:

 The top quark announced in 1995 by the DØ experiment and CDF experiment.
 The bottom quark, which was observed as a quark-antiquark pair called the Upsilon meson announced in 1977 by Experiment 228.
 The tau neutrino, announced in July 2000 by the DONUT collaboration.
 The bottom Omega baryon, announced by the DØ experiment of Fermilab in 2008.

In 1999, physicists at on the KTeV experiment were also the first to observe direct CP violation in kaon decays.

The DØ experiment and CDF experiment each made important contributions to the observation of the Higgs Boson, announced in 2012.

Site

Access
In spring 2022, the Fermilab site reopened to the public for outdoor activities after closure due to the COVID-19 pandemic in the United States.  Activities may include  biking, hiking, running and viewing the bison herd, however, fishing, which was previously allowed, is now forbidden.  Indoor access remains limited.   All adult visitors entering site must present a government-issued photo ID, and REAL ID-compliant IDs will be required after May 3, 2023.  Up-to-date specifics about access can be found on the Fermilab website.

Architecture

Fermilab's first director, Robert Wilson, insisted that the site's aesthetic complexion not be marred by a collection of concrete block buildings. The design of the administrative building (Wilson Hall) was inspired by St. Pierre's Cathedral in Beauvais, France, though it was realized in a Brutalist style. Several of the buildings and sculptures within the Fermilab reservation represent various mathematical constructs as part of their structure.

The Archimedean Spiral is the defining shape of several pumping stations as well as the building housing the MINOS experiment. The reflecting pond at Wilson Hall also showcases a  hyperbolic obelisk, designed by Wilson. Some of the high-voltage transmission lines carrying power through the laboratory's land are built to echo the Greek letter π. One can also find structural examples of the DNA double-helix spiral and a nod to the geodesic sphere.

Wilson's sculptures on the site include Tractricious, a free-standing arrangement of steel tubes near the Industrial Complex constructed from parts and materials recycled from the Tevatron collider, and the soaring Broken Symmetry, which greets those entering the campus via the Pine Street entrance. Also scattered about the access roads and village are a massive hydraulic press and old magnetic containment channels, all painted blue.

Wildlife

In 1967, Wilson brought five American bison to the site, a bull and four cows, and an additional 21 were provided by the Illinois Department of Conservation. Some fearful locals believed at first that the bison were introduced in order to serve as an alarm if and when radiation at the laboratory reached dangerous levels, but they were assured by Fermilab that this claim had no merit. Today, the Fermilab bison herd is a popular attraction that draws many visitors and the grounds are also a sanctuary for other local wildlife populations. A Christmas Bird Count has occurred at the lab every year since 1976.

Working with the Forest Preserve District of DuPage County, Fermilab has introduced barn owls to selected structures around the grounds.

Tritium on site
During running, particle beams produce tritium, an isotope of hydrogen consisting of a proton and two neutrons that is weakly radioactive with a half-life of 12.3 years. This can bind with oxygen to form water. Tritium levels measured on site are very low compared to federal health and environmental standards. Fermilab monitors tritium leaving the site in surface and sewer water, and provides a useful FAQ sheet for those who want to learn more.

See also
 Big Science
 Center for the Advancement of Science in Space—operates the US National Laboratory on the ISS.
 CERN
 Fermi Linux LTS
 Scientific Linux
 Stanford Linear Accelerator Center

References

External links

Fermi National Accelerator Laboratory
Fermilab Today Daily newsletter
Other Fermilab online publications
Fermilab Virtual Tour
Architecture at the Fermilab campus

 
United States Department of Energy national laboratories
Federally Funded Research and Development Centers
Particle physics facilities
Batavia, Illinois
Buildings and structures in DuPage County, Illinois
Buildings and structures in Kane County, Illinois
Tourist attractions in DuPage County, Illinois
Tourist attractions in Kane County, Illinois
Education in DuPage County, Illinois
Education in Kane County, Illinois
Bison herds
1967 establishments in Illinois
Theoretical physics institutes
Nuclear research institutes
Institutes associated with CERN
Research institutes in Illinois
Enrico Fermi